UH South/University Oaks is a light rail station in Houston, Texas, on the Purple Line of the METRORail system. It is on Wheeler Avenue near Martin Luther King Jr. Boulevard on the south side of the University of Houston campus by University Oaks.

UH South/University Oaks station opened on May 23, 2015.

References

METRORail stations
Railway stations in Texas at university and college campuses
Railway stations in the United States opened in 2015
2015 establishments in Texas
University of Houston
Railway stations in Harris County, Texas